The 1975–76 Hellenic Football League season was the 23rd in the history of the Hellenic Football League, a football competition in England.

Premier Division

The Premier Division featured 14 clubs which competed in the division last season, along with two new clubs:
Forest Green Rovers, joined from the Gloucestershire County League
Stratford Town, transferred from the Midland Combination

League table

Division One

The Division One featured 12 clubs which competed in the division last season, along with 2 new clubs:
Rivet Sports, relegated from the Premier Division
Abingdon Town, relegated from the Premier Division

League table

References

External links
 Hellenic Football League

1975-76
H